Robinsons Novaliches (formerly known as Robinsons Place Novaliches and Robinsons Nova Market) is a shopping mall in Fairview owned and operated by Robinsons Malls, the second largest mall operator in the Philippines. This mall was opened on November 9, 2001. It is the second mall by Robinsons Malls in Quezon City after Robinsons Galleria.

Redevelopment and expansion
In 2008, Robinsons Place Novaliches was renamed to Robinsons Nova Market. Robinsons Department Store was closed then Bargain Exchange was replaced and several stores pulled out and it opened an opportunity for micro-retails. In 2010, Robinsons Movieworld Novaliches closed Cinemas 5 to 8 being rented by some Christian Churches inside the mall. Examples of some Christian churches that rented Cinemas 5-8 are Word of Hope Christian Church which occupies Cinemas 5 and 6 and Victory Christian Church which occupies Cinema 7. In 2012, Cinemas 1 to 4 has permanently closed and it is open for rentals for some Christian Churches and for others.

The mall had undergone major renovation and expansion against Ayala Malls' Fairview Terraces and SM Prime Holdings' SM City Fairview. The said expansion houses over 200 micro-retail shops and bargain stores selling apparel, shoes and bags, novelty and gift items and gadgets; food court, Trade Hall, and al fresco dining restaurants. It was opened on May 29, 2015. It added another  to the  square meters so it will have a total floor area of  square meters. And eventually after the expansion, it was renamed as Robinsons Novaliches. 

Moreover, Robinsons Digiworld was opened at the Level 2 of the Main Mall which occupies the old location of some bargain things and a passport office of the Department of Foreign Affairs called DFA CO NCR-North was also opened at the Level 3 near the former Robinsons Movieworld Novaliches in November 2016.

See also
Fairview Terraces
SM City Fairview
Robinsons Magnolia
List of shopping malls in Metro Manila

References

Shopping malls in Quezon City
Buildings and structures in Quezon City
Tourist attractions in Quezon City
Shopping malls established in 2001
Robinsons Malls